The Municipality of Bifrost – Riverton is a rural municipality (RM) in the Canadian province of Manitoba.

History

The municipality was incorporated on January 1, 2015 via the amalgamation of the RM of Bifrost and the Village of Riverton. It was formed as a requirement of The Municipal Amalgamations Act, which required that municipalities with a population less than 1,000 amalgamate with one or more neighbouring municipalities by 2015. The Government of Manitoba initiated these amalgamations in order for municipalities to meet the 1997 minimum population requirement of 1,000 to incorporate a municipality.  The amalgamation did not include Town of Arborg which is surrounded by Bifrost – Riverton.

The municipality includes numerous manufacturing companies including Vidir Solutions, Romafa Metal Works, and Diemo Machine.

Communities 
 Hnausa
 Morweena
 Riverton
Okno

Demographics 

See also
 Arborg, Manitoba

References

External links 
 Municipality of Bifrost - Riverton
 Manitoba Historical Society - Municipality of Bifrost - Riverton

2015 establishments in Manitoba
Manitoba municipal amalgamations, 2015
Populated places established in 2015
Rural municipalities in Manitoba